{{DISPLAYTITLE:Delta3 Canis Minoris}}

Delta3 Canis Minoris, Latinized from δ3 Canis Minoris, is a solitary, white-hued star in the equatorial constellation of Canis Minor. At that distance, the visual magnitude of these stars is diminished by an extinction of more than 0.15 due to interstellar dust. With an apparent visual magnitude of +5.81, it is just bright enough to be faintly visible to the naked eye.

The star has an estimated 3.16 times the mass of the Sun and about 2.1 times the Sun's radius. It is radiating 175 times the Sun's luminosity from its photosphere at an effective temperature of 9,908 K.

References

B-type main-sequence stars
Canis Minoris, Delta3
Canis Minor
Durchmusterung objects
Canis Minoris, 09
060357
036812
2901